Milan Đurđević (born 4 November 1967) is a Serbian former professional footballer who played as a striker.

Nicknamed Kempes, due to physical resemblance to the famous Argentine footballer, Đurđević is best remembered for his stints with Partizan and PAOK.

Club career
After starting out at OFK Beograd in the mid-1980s, Đurđević was transferred to Partizan in the late summer of 1989. He spent two seasons at the Stadion JNA, before moving abroad and signing with the Greek side PAOK in the summer of 1991. Subsequently, Đurđević stayed there for the next two years, scoring 17 league goals in 45 appearances. He also briefly played for Panachaiki, but failed to help them avoid relegation from the top flight of Greek football in the 1993–94 campaign. Afterward, Đurđević spent one season with Spanish club Mallorca, receiving limited playing time. He then shortly played for Portuguese club Leça and French club Perpignan, before returning to Greece. Finally, Đurđević spent half a season at both PAS Giannina and Kastoria, before retiring from the game.

International career
Đurđević made one appearance for the Yugoslavia national under-18 team in March 1986, a 3–1 win over Spain, in which Davor Šuker scored a hat-trick.

Statistics

Post-playing
In January 2012, forty-four-year-old Đurđević got arrested in Thessaloniki, Greece on charges of extortion, racketeering, and loan-sharking that he had allegedly engaged in as part—and one of the leaders—of an organized criminal group operating in the country.

References

External links
 
 
 
 

Association football forwards
Expatriate footballers in France
Expatriate footballers in Greece
Expatriate footballers in Portugal
Expatriate footballers in Spain
FK Partizan players
Footballers from Belgrade
Kastoria F.C. players
Leça F.C. players
Ligue 2 players
OFK Beograd players
Panachaiki F.C. players
PAOK FC players
PAS Giannina F.C. players
RCD Mallorca players
Canet Roussillon FC players
Segunda División players
Serbia and Montenegro expatriate footballers
Serbia and Montenegro expatriate sportspeople in France
Serbia and Montenegro expatriate sportspeople in Greece
Serbia and Montenegro expatriate sportspeople in Spain
Serbia and Montenegro footballers
Serbian footballers
Super League Greece players
Yugoslav First League players
Yugoslav footballers
1967 births
Living people
Serbian expatriate sportspeople in Portugal